The 1996–97 OB I bajnokság season was the 60th season of the OB I bajnokság, the top level of ice hockey in Hungary. Five teams participated in the league, and Ferencvarosi TC won the championship.

Regular season

Final 
 Dunaferr Dunaújváros - Ferencvárosi TC 0:2 (3:4 SO, 1:5)

External links
 Season on hockeyarchives.info

OB I bajnoksag seasons
Hun
OB